Vincenzo Plescia (born 18 February 1998) is an Italian football player who plays as a forward for  club Piacenza on loan from Avellino.

Club career
He made his Serie C debut for Gubbio on 23 September 2018 in a game against Vis Pesaro.

On 15 July 2019, he joined Renate. On 2 October 2020 he moved on loan to Vibonese.

On 2 August 2021, Plescia joined Avellino. On 23 July 2022, he was loaned to Carrarese, with an option to buy. On 2 January 2023, Plescia moved on a new loan to Piacenza.

References

External links
 
 
 

1998 births
Living people
Footballers from Palermo
Italian footballers
Association football forwards
Serie C players
Serie D players
Palermo F.C. players
Siracusa Calcio players
A.S.D. Roccella players
Empoli F.C. players
A.S. Gubbio 1910 players
A.C. Renate players
U.S. Vibonese Calcio players
U.S. Avellino 1912 players
Carrarese Calcio players
Piacenza Calcio 1919 players